Shah Gheyb (also Romanized as Shāh Gheyb, Shāh-e Gheyb, and Shah Gheib) is a village in Darz and Sayeban Rural District, in the Central District of Larestan County, Fars Province, Iran. At the 2016 census, its population was 1496, in 122 families.

References 

Populated places in Larestan County